The following is a list of public housing estates in Sheung Shui Town, Hong Kong, including Home Ownership Scheme (HOS), Private Sector Participation Scheme (PSPS), Sandwich Class Housing Scheme (SCHS), Flat-for-Sale Scheme (FFSS), and Tenants Purchase Scheme (TPS) estates.

Overview

Cheung Lung Wai Estate

Cheung Lung Wai Estate is the latest public estate in North District, it has 2 blocks built in 2015.

Ching Ho Estate

Ching Ho Estate is the second latest public estate in North District. Its name, "Ching Ho", means "clear river" in Chinese.

The estate is developed into 3 phases, with a total of 8 "New Harmony" residential buildings and a shopping centre. Phase 3 consists of 3 blocks completed in 2007. Phase 2 and Phase 1 consists of a total of 5 blocks and the shopping centre completed in 2008.

Ching Long House was placed under lockdown for mandatory covid test on 15 February 2022.

Choi Po Court

Choi Po Court is an HOS housing estate in Sheung Shui Town, near Choi Yuen Estate and Sheung Shui station. It has totally 4 blocks built in 1982.

Choi Yuen Estate

Choi Yuen Estate is a public estate located near Sheung Shui station and Landmark North in Sheung Shui Town. It is the first public housing estate in North District, which consists of 6 residential blocks built between 1981 and 1983.

The site of Choi Yuen Estate was formerly occupied by vegetable farms and the nearby village was called Tsoi Yuen Tsuen, which meant Vegetable Farm Village in Chinese. In the 1970s, the vegetable farms were removed to construct Choi Yuen Estate; "菜園村" and "彩園邨" sound almost the same except the tone of the character "菜" / "彩". In the 1990s, the village was demolished to build Landmark North, one of the largest shopping malls in North District.

Po Shek Wu Estate

Po Shek Wu Estate is a public housing estate at the junction of Po Shek Wu Road and Choi Yuen Road in Sheung Shui, near MTR Sheung Shui station. It comprises 3 blocks of 25, 29 and 33 storeys on a 3-storeyed carpark podium including one semi-basement storey for car park at a total number of 1,144 units. One ancillary facility block including socket-H pile foundation, superstructure and E&M services, one kindergarten, ground floor retail facilities and roof garden site formation and slope upgrading works.

On Shing Court

On Shing Court is a HOS court in Sheung Shui, near Tin Ping Estate. It has only 1 block built in 1990.

Sunningdale Garden

Sunningdale Garden is a PSPS housing estate in Sheung Shui Town, near Sheung Shui Town Centre and Shek Wu Hui. It has 4 blocks built in 1992.

Tai Ping Estate

Tai Ping Estate is a mixed public and TPS housing estate consisting of 4 residential buildings completed in 1989. Some of the flats were sold to tenants through Tenants Purchase Scheme Phase 5 in 2002.

Tin Ping Estate

Tin Ping Estate is the northernmost mixed public and TPS housing estate in Sheung Shui Town. It consists of 7 residential buildings completed between 1986 and 1990. Some of the flats were sold to tenants through Tenants Purchase Scheme Phase 3 in 2000.

Tsui Lai Garden

Tsui Lai Garden is a PSPS housing estate in Sheung Shui Town, near North District Sports Ground. It has 6 blocks built in 1990.

Yuk Po Court

Yuk Po Court is an HOS housing estate in Sheung Shui Town, near Choi Yuen Estate and Sheung Shui station. It has totally 8 blocks built in 1982.

See also
 Public housing in Hong Kong
 List of public housing estates in Hong Kong

References

Sheung Shui